Cecil Beresford Ramage, MC (17 January 1895 – 22 February 1988) was a Scottish barrister, actor and Liberal politician.

Life
Following his education at the Edinburgh Academy, Ramage was commissioned as an officer in the Royal Scots at the outbreak of World War I. He served in Gallipoli, Palestine and Egypt and was awarded the Military Cross.

Following the war, he went up to Pembroke College, Oxford, where he became President of the Oxford Union. At Oxford he first took to the stage, appearing in Antony and Cleopatra with Cathleen Nesbitt, whom he married in 1921. They had two children. Instead of taking up acting as a profession after university, Ramage read law. He was called to the bar at the Middle Temple, and practised on the Oxford Circuit.

At the 1922 general election he was the Liberal candidate for the constituency of Newcastle West, but was defeated by David Adams of the Labour Party. Another election was held in 1923 and Ramage stood again and was elected as Member of Parliament (MP). He was only to be in the Commons for a short period, as he was defeated at the subsequent general election in 1924. He was the Liberal candidate at Southport at the 1929 general election, but failed to be elected.
 
By this time Ramage was a professional actor, appearing in New York, the West End of London and toured with the Old Vic Company in the Mediterranean. He had a number of minor roles in films, including Secret of Stamboul (1936), Nicholas Nickleby (1947) and Kind Hearts and Coronets (1949).

His career eventually declined, and he retired from the stage and was separated from his wife, Nesbitt, who died in 1982, aged 93. He played the Crown Counsel in Kind Hearts and Coronets, whose devastating cross-examination of Louis Mazzini does much to discredit him.

Death
Cecil Beresford Ramage died in 1988, aged 93. Of the 64 former MPs who only served in the parliament of 1924, he was the last survivor, outliving his parliamentary service by 63 years.

Selected filmography
 Account Rendered (1932)
 C.O.D. (1932)
 The Strangler (1932)
 The Luck of a Sailor (1934)
 What Happened Then? (1934)
 The Night of the Party (1935)
 King of the Damned (1935)
 McGlusky the Sea Rover (1935)
 Be Careful, Mr. Smith (1935)
 Lonely Road (1936)
 Love in Exile (1936)
 The Secret of Stamboul (1936)
 Cafe Colette (1937)
 Return of a Stranger (1937)
 I Live in Grosvenor Square (1945)
 Kind Hearts and Coronets (1949)

References

External links 

1895 births
1988 deaths
Liberal Party (UK) MPs for English constituencies
UK MPs 1923–1924
Royal Scots officers
Members of the Middle Temple
People educated at Edinburgh Academy
Alumni of Pembroke College, Oxford
Presidents of the Oxford Union
Male actors from Edinburgh
British Army personnel of World War I
Recipients of the Military Cross
Scottish barristers
Scottish male stage actors
Scottish male film actors
20th-century Scottish male actors
British male comedy actors
British actor-politicians
Politicians from Edinburgh